Elyria is a city in and the county seat of Lorain County, Ohio, United States, located at the forks of the Black River in Northeast Ohio  southwest of Cleveland. As of the 2020 census, the city had a population of 52,656. It is a principle city in the Cleveland metropolitan area. The city is home to Lorain County Community College.

Etymology
The city's name is derived from the surname of its founder, Heman Ely, and Illyria, the historical name used by ancient Greeks and Romans to refer to the western Balkans.
(Elyria)

History
The village of Elyria was founded in 1817 by Heman Ely, who built a log house, dam, gristmill, and sawmill on the village's site along the Black River. Ely began to build more houses to accommodate European-American settlers migrating to what was, at that time, within Huron County, Ohio. By the time Ely died in 1852, Elyria had five churches, three grocery stores, three flour mills, a newspaper, and a population of more than 1,500. Early postal service from Cleveland was provided by Artemis Beebe, a rider who held the first contract to deliver mail across this section of the Black River.

By the turn of the 20th century, Elyria was a town of about 8,000. In 1908, Elyria Memorial Hospital was built. In the first half of the 20th century, the town developed some manufacturing, as well as a range of retail businesses.

In August 1967, at the peak of Elyria's population, Midway Mall was opened. It changed the local economy by attracting local businesses from the town center or causing so much competition they went out of business. Industrial restructuring meant that good jobs left the area, and poverty increased. Three major car plant closings in the area led to economic stagnation and joblessness in the 1970s and 1980s that affected numerous communities. The region was nicknamed "the Rustbelt," suggesting the decline of its former industries.

In the 1990s, Elyria experienced a minor revival with construction of some new roads and housing. It serves as a residential, suburban "bedroom community" for Cleveland, where new businesses and industries are developing with an increase in new jobs.

In the 2000s and 2010s, companies like Bendix and 3M moved their operations elsewhere. To prepare for this, voters passed Issue 6 in March 2016. Issue 6 increased the city's income tax by 0.5%. It was used to pay for police, parks, and fiber-optic Internet in the city. With the reconstruction of State Route 57 on the city's northwest side by Midway Mall, traffic flow was improved.

Geography
Elyria, part of the Cleveland–Elyria–Mentor metropolitan area, is located at  (41.373396, −82.101692). Elyria's primary zip code is 44035 with post office boxes being assigned the zip code 44036.

The Black River flows through Elyria.

Demographics

2020 census
According to the 2020 United States census, Elyria had a population of 52,656. Of which, 69.6% were non-hispanic White, 14.0% were non-hispanic Black, 8.3% were Hispanic/Latino, 0.8% were Asian, 7.3% mixed or other.

2010 census
As of the census of 2010, there were 54,533 people, 22,400 households, and 14,093 families living in the city. The racial makeup of the city was 78.1% White, 15.5% African American, 0.3% Native American, 0.8% Asian, 1.2% from other races, and 4.1% from two or more races. Hispanic or Latino of any race were 4.9% of the population.

There were 22,400 households, of which 31.6% had children under the age of 18 living with them, 39.5% were married couples living together, 17.8% had a female householder with no husband present, 5.6% had a male householder with no wife present, and 37.1% were non-families. 30.5% of all households were made up of individuals, and 10.5% had someone living alone who was 65 years of age or older. The average household size was 2.39 and the average family size was 2.97.

The median age in the city was 38.1 years. 24.2% of residents were under the age of 18; 9% were between the ages of 18 and 24; 25.7% were from 25 to 44; 26.8% were from 45 to 64; and 14.3% were 65 years of age or older. The gender makeup of the city was 47.8% male and 52.2% female.

2000 census
As of the census of 2000, there were 55,953 people, 22,409 households, and 14,834 families living in the city. The population density was 2,813.7 people per square mile (1,086.2/km2). There were 23,841 housing units at an average density of 1,198.9 per square mile (462.8/km2). The racial makeup of the city was 81.3% White, 14.2% African American, 0.27% Native American, 0.61% Asian, 0.02% Pacific Islander, 0.95% from other races, and 2.64% from two or more races. Hispanic or Latino of any race were 2.78% of the population.

There were 22,409 households, out of which 31.9% had children under the age of 18 living with them, 46.4% were married couples living together, 15.1% had a female householder with no husband present, and 33.8% were non-families. 28.5% of all households were made up of individuals, and 10.6% had someone living alone who was 65 years of age or older. The average household size was 2.46 and the average family size was 3.01.

In the city, the population was spread out, with 26.6% under the age of 18, 8.9% from 18 to 24, 30.2% from 25 to 44, 21.3% from 45 to 64, and 13.0% who were 65 years of age or older. The median age was 35 years. For every 100 females, there were 92.4 males. For every 100 females age 18 and over, there were 88.7 males.

The median income for a household in the city was $38,156, and the median income for a family was $45,846. Males had a median income of $34,898 versus $24,027 for females. The per capita income for the city was $19,344. About 9.5% of families and 11.7% of the population were below the poverty line, including 19.0% of those under age 18 and 7.5% of those age 65 or over.

Community
Elyria is served by University Hospitals Elyria Medical Center. Neighborhoods are spread throughout all areas of the city, with most neighborhoods being traditional. Most housing developments are on the far east-side of the city.

Parks and recreation
Elyria has a large number of parks and recreational centers that include a variety of activities such as baseball and playground equipment. The four recreational centers are named after their locations: North, East, South, and West. They each include one or more baseball fields and at least two tennis courts.

There are two main parks, Cascade and Elywood, which are connected by an elevated pedestrian bridge in the center.

Cascade Park

Cascade Park is the largest and most popular park in Elyria. The park is located in a ravine carved by the same glaciers that created the Great Lakes. Cascade park has a large playground and a large hill that was previously used for seating at the 4th of July fireworks show, and was a popular spot for sledding during winter months. The park is centered along the Black River.

The park used to have three captive black bears, held in cages attached to a rock. Bears were featured in the park from 1920 to 1980.

The Lorain County Metro Parks took over control of Cascade Park in late 2014, and has unveiled a master plan project throughout 2018 to restore the park for better and safer use, as well as maintain the park.

Economy
Elyria is home to the headquarters of Invacare, Ridge Tool Company, Diamond Products, and EMC Precision Machining. Riddell and Bendix previously operated a factory in Elyria. Elyria Plating Corporation has been in the same location since 1937.

Top employers
According to the city's 2017 Comprehensive Annual Financial Report, the top employers in the city were:

Schools

Elyria's schools including Elyria High School. The Elyria City Schools district consisted at one time two high schools, five junior high schools, nine elementary schools, and one kindergarten school. Elyria is also home to Elyria Catholic High School. In 2010 Elyria High School was torn down for plans to build a new one. The building was fully completed during the 2012–2013 school year. Elyria is also home to the Open Door Christian School.

Transportation
Lorain County Transit is based in Elyria. Elyria is served by many highways, including U.S. Route 20, the Ohio Turnpike, and State Routes 2, 113, 301 and 57.

The general airport for Elyria and Lorain is the Lorain County Regional Airport (located in New Russia Township), and Cleveland Hopkins International Airport is the nearest major airport. The Elyria Amtrak Station provides train transportation. Greyhound bus service is also available in the city.

Elyria in popular culture
The film Take Shelter includes a scene in which Michael Shannon enters the Elyria Main branch library and looks for books. The character of Officer Richard Lymangood, in the film Blue Thunder, was born in Elyria, according to the helicopter terminal database. In the 2015 film The Bronze starring Melissa Rauch, Midway Mall was used for a number of scenes with Elyria residents as extras in the film.

Elyria is also home to a yearly charity event: The Elyria Superhero Weekend where local businesses hosted by Atlas Cinema Midway Mall 8, Keith's Comics, Super Heroes To Kids In Ohio and the Mayor's Office participate in a citywide free event for local and Cleveland area residents which was started in 2012. The event promotes literacy through comic books, community unity and works to help children suffering from illness. The event is centered on whichever super hero comic book film comes out the same weekend as Free Comic Book Day and is split between a number of days during that period: the first day being at Altas cinema, the 2nd in Ely Square and at Keith's Comics in downtown Elyria. The Elyria Public Library, Elyria Comic Book Initiative and The Gathering Community Church among many other notable Elyria organizations and businesses have contributed during the growth of the event.

Notable people

 Sherwood Anderson, writer, lived here as business owner in early 1900s before abandoning it in 1912
 Wayne Barlow, composer (1912–1996)
 Alonzo Barnard (1817–1905), Presbyterian missionary and abolitionist 
 Tianna Bartoletta, track and field athlete (2005 and 2015 World Championship long jump gold medalist, 2012 and 2016 Olympic 4x100 relay gold medalist, 2016 long jump gold medalist)
 Keefe Brasselle, actor, title role of 1953 movie The Eddie Cantor Story
 Joseph M. Bryan, insurance executive and philanthropist
 Thelma Drake, politician
 Lynn Evans of The Chordettes
 Arthur Lovett Garford, padded bicycle seat inventor and automobile manufacturer
 Doug Gillard, musician and songwriter, lead guitarist for Guided by Voices       
 Vic Janowicz, former baseball and football player, 1950 Heisman Trophy winner
 Tony Curcillo, First Ohio State University quarterback under Woody Hayes, NFL player (Chicago Cardinals), CFL player (Hamilton Tiger Cats)
 Herbert Fisk Johnson Sr., CEO of S. C. Johnson & Son
 Samuel Curtis Johnson Sr., founder of S. C. Johnson & Son
 Anodea Judith, author, therapist, public speaker and expert on Chakra system
 James Kirkwood Jr., playwright, author and actor, lived here during childhood; won Tony Award for book of A Chorus Line
 Eric Lauer, baseball player
 Lila Lee (1905–1973), actress from silent era; buried in Brookdale Cemetery in Elyria
 Robert Edwin Lee, playwright and lyricist
 Brianne McLaughlin, attended Elyria Catholic High School, ice hockey goaltender, Olympic medal winner (2010 and 2014)
 Les Miles, former LSU Tigers head football coach
 Haruki Nakamura, professional football player
 Danny Noble, professional football player for Tampa Bay Buccaneers
 Dav Pilkey, author of children's books
 Tim Rattay, professional football player
 Clayton Rawson, mystery writer, editor, and amateur magician
 Charles Roser, real estate developer: developed Roser Park and Anna Maria, businessman and philanthropist.
 Gary R. Stevenson, sports media executive 
 Chad Szeliga, drummer for Breaking Benjamin
 Textbeak, DJ and record producer
 Steve Tovar, professional football player
 Charles Vinci Jr., weightlifter, Olympic champion in 1956
 Mark Winger, convicted murderer
 Victoria Wells Wulsin, born in town, became doctor and international epidemiologist 
 Norma Jean Wright, former lead singer for band Chic

References

External links

 
 Elyria Municipal Court website

Travel
 

 
Cities in Ohio
Cities in Lorain County, Ohio
County seats in Ohio
Populated places established in 1817
Cleveland metropolitan area
1817 establishments in Ohio
Western Reserve, Ohio